Gaius Charles (born May 2, 1983) is an American actor known for his portrayal of Brian "Smash" Williams in the television drama, Friday Night Lights. He also played Dr. Shane Ross on the ABC medical drama series Grey's Anatomy and a recurring role on the NBC historical-drama series Aquarius, as Black Panther leader Bunchy Carter. He also played a role on NCISs ninth season as Jason King, an arson investigator for the Baltimore Police Department.

Early life
Charles was born on May 2, 1983 in Manhattan, New York. He was raised in New York City and Teaneck, New Jersey.  

Charles graduated from Teaneck High School in 2001. He attended Carnegie Mellon University's College of Fine Arts, earning a Bachelor of Fine Arts degree in drama. He also studied at the National Institute of Dramatic Art (NIDA) in Sydney, Australia.  He earned a Master of Arts degree in Religious Studies from Drew University.

Career

In 2017, Charles starred in the first season of NBC's television drama series Taken, based on the Taken film franchise.  He has appeared in multiple television series, including Friday Night Lights, Grey's Anatomy, and Aquarius, in which he portrayed Civil Rights Activist and Black Panther Bunchy Carter, and Necessary Roughness.
 
Charles made guest appearances on Marvel's Agents of S.H.I.E.L.D., Blindspot, Comedy Central's Drunk History, in which he portrayed Muhammad Ali, NCIS, Pan Am, and Law & Order: SVU. His film credits include the independent features The Stanford Prison Experiment, Toe To Toe, and The Messenger. He's also worked on studio films like Salt and Takers. In addition to film and television, Charles starred in the Labyrinth Theater Company's production of Othello alongside Philip Seymour Hoffman and John Ortiz. He received positive reviews for originating the roles of “EZ” in Beau Willimon's play Lower Ninth and “Malcolm” in director Thomas Kail's Broke-ology.

Filmography

Film

Television

References

External links

 

1983 births
Living people
Male actors from New Jersey
Male actors from New York City
African-American male actors
African-American Christians
American male film actors
American male stage actors
American male television actors
Carnegie Mellon University College of Fine Arts alumni
People from Manhattan
Teaneck High School alumni
21st-century American male actors